BC Cygni (BC Cyg, HIP 100404, BD + 37 3903) is a red supergiant and pulsating variable star of spectral type M3.5Ia in the constellation Cygnus.

It is one of largest stars known.

The brightness of BC Cyg varies from visual magnitude +9.0 and +10.8 with a period of 720 ± 40 days. Between around the year 1900 and 2000 appears to have increased its average brightness of 0.5 magnitudes.

See also
NML Cygni
KY Cygni
RW Cygni

References 

M-type supergiants
Semiregular variable stars
Cygnus (constellation)
100404
BD+37 3903
Cygnus, BC
J20213855+3731589
IRAS catalogue objects